Taeniophyllum lobatum, commonly known as the yellow ribbonroot, is a species of leafless epiphytic or lithophytic orchid that forms small clumps. It has short stems, flattened pale to greyish green roots pressed against the substrate on which it is growing and usually two pale to bright yellow flowers. It only occurs in tropical North Queensland.

Description
Taeniophyllum lobatum is a leafless, epiphytic or lithophytic herb that forms small clumps. The side lobes are erect, curve inwards and touch. Flowering occurs from August to November.

Taxonomy and naming
Taeniophyllum lobatum was first formally described in 1956 by Alick Dockrill and the description was published in The Victorian Naturalist. The specific epithet (lobatum) is derived from the Latin  word lobus meaning "an elongated projection or protuberance", referring to "the large lateral lobes of the labellum".

Distribution and habitat
The yellow ribbonroot mostly grows on the smallest branches of rainforest trees sometimes on rocks. It is found between the McIlwraith Range and Paluma in Queensland.

References

lobatum
Endemic orchids of Australia
Orchids of Queensland
Plants described in 1956